Gangchon Station is a railway station on the Gyeongchun Line.

Railway stations in Gangwon Province, South Korea
Seoul Metropolitan Subway stations
Metro stations in Chuncheon
Railway stations opened in 1939